The 1989 Philippine Basketball Association (PBA) Open Conference was the first conference of the 1989 PBA season. It started on March 5 and ended on May 21, 1989. The tournament is an Import-laden format, which requires an import or a pure-foreign player for each team.

Format
The following format will be observed for the duration of the conference:
 Double-round robin eliminations; 10 games per team; Teams are then seeded by basis on win–loss records.
 Team with the worst record after the elimination round will be eliminated. 
 Semifinals will be two round robin affairs with the five remaining teams. Results from the elimination round will be carried over.
 The top two teams in the semifinals advance to the best of seven finals. The last two teams dispute the third-place trophy in a best-of-five playoff.

Elimination round

Semifinals

Cumulative standings

Semifinal round standings:

Third place playoffs

Finals

References

PBA Open Conference
Open Conference